Hirche is a German surname. Notable people with this surname include:
 (born 1959), German theatre director
 (born 1946), German architect
 (born 1957), German entrepreneur
 (born 1961), German politician
Herbert Hirche (1910–2002), German architect and furniture and product designer
Klaus Hirche (1939–2022), German ice hockey goalie
 (1922–1986), German footballer
Sandra Hirche (born 1974), German engineer
 (1923–2003), German writer
 (born 1941), German politician

See also
Hirsh

German-language surnames